Yolanda Guadalupe Valladares Valle (born 20 February 1959) is a Mexican politician affiliated with the National Action Party. As of 2014 she served as Deputy of the LIX Legislature of the Mexican Congress as a plurinominal representative. She currently serves as President of the State of Campeche chapter of the National Action Party. Under her mandate the Party won half of the city councils of that State in the 2015 local election.

Known for her strong personality, she is one of the most influential women in the southeastern Mexican region.

References

1959 births
Living people
Politicians from Campeche
Women members of the Chamber of Deputies (Mexico)
Members of the Chamber of Deputies (Mexico)
National Action Party (Mexico) politicians
Autonomous University of Campeche alumni
National Autonomous University of Mexico alumni
Academic staff of the Autonomous University of Campeche
Members of the Congress of Campeche
21st-century Mexican politicians
21st-century Mexican women politicians
Deputies of the LIX Legislature of Mexico